The Rothesay class, or Type 12M frigates were a class of frigates serving with the Royal Navy, South African Navy (where they were called President-class frigates) and the Royal New Zealand Navy.

However, such were the capabilities and potential of the design that it was deemed suitable for use as a fast fleet anti-submarine warfare escort. As such, a repeat and improved Type 12 design was prepared, known as the Type 12M (M for "modified") and called the Rothesay class after the lead ship. A total of twelve vessels were constructed, with the lead ship being laid down in 1956, two years after the last Whitby. The design was successful and popular, serving the Royal Navy and South African Navy well into the 1980s, and serving with distinction in the Falklands War.

The class was highly adaptable and further modifications led to the equally successful Leander-class (Type 12I).

Design
The Type 12M retained the hull design of the Type 12, that allowed high cruising speed to be maintained in heavy seas, critical to the success of anti-submarine warfare in the era of the threat of the high-speed Soviet submarine. Armament and the propulsion plant remained largely unchanged. The main external differences were an enlarged raked and streamlined funnel (retroactively fitted to the Whitbys) and a modified after deckhouse, enlarged to carry the SeaCat anti-aircraft missile launcher and its associated GWS-20 director and handling rooms as it became available. This weapon was not available at the time the first ships in class were completed, and either a twin Bofors 40 mm gun in a "Stabilised Tachymetric Anti-Aircraft Gun" (STAAG) mounting (Rothesay) or a single Bofors 40 mm gun on a Mk.7 mount was shipped in lieu. The arrangement of the torpedo tubes was also altered in the new design, with four fixed tubes firing aft at 45° on each beam, in front of a trainable twin mounting; the reverse of the arrangement on the Whitbys. A suitable weapon was never developed for these tubes, so they remained unused, or were never fitted. Internally, electrical generation capacity was increased to handle the increasing demands created by improved ship electronics. Accommodation standards were also improved, with partial bunking and air conditioning. Such was the success of the Rothesay design that it was elaborated into the excellent general purpose , the Type 12I.

Modification

Increasing submarine performance in the 1960s demanded detection and engagement of targets at a greater distance from the fleet. Detection was improved with new sonar designs such as the Type 177 search and Type 199 Variable depth. To attack targets at a greater range, the Royal Navy adopted the MATCH (Medium-range Anti-submarine Torpedo Carrying Helicopter) system. MATCH was essentially the Westland Wasp HAS.1, a lightweight navalised development of the Saro P.531 (and related to the Army's Westland Scout) helicopter small enough to operate from the small hangar and flight deck that could be fitted to contemporary frigate designs, yet large enough to carry a pair of anti-submarine homing torpedoes (US Mark 44 or 46 types), allowing engagement of underwater targets at some distance from the parent vessel, outside the range of the shipboard Limbo anti-submarine mortars. To allow MATCH to be carried, all of the Type 12M class were modified and modernised, beginning with Rothesay from 1966 and finishing in 1972.

The after superstructure was removed, along with the foremost Limbo mortar, with the well being plated over to create a small flight deck. A small hangar was constructed in front of this, on top of which the GWS-20 SeaCat missile and director was (finally) shipped. The mainmast was replaced by an enclosed design, carrying the Type 1010 IFF antennas, and the funnel height was increased to carry the hot exhaust gasses over the taller superstructure. The electronics fit was also upgraded from the World War II era sets fitted in the Whitbys. A large, enclosed foremast replaced the short lattice one, carrying the distinctive "quarter cheese" antennas associated with the Type 993 target indicator. The Mark 6M director was replaced with the MRS3 Mod 3 system carrying radar Type 903, the later more automated and compact 1967–73 version of MRS3 using transistor electronics and analogue computers allowing the removal of the Type 277Q height finder. Additionally, Knebworth/Corvus 3-inch countermeasures launchers were fitted on either side of the bridge, as were a pair of World War II vintage 20 mm Oerlikon guns for "policing" work (and strictly limited anti-aircraft defence).

The extensive modifications of the Rothesays brought their armament and anti-submarine capabilities into line with that of the original Leander-class vessels. However the last four Leanders had Doppler full spectrum 184 sonar which gave a clearer faster-read sonar, and all the Leanders originally had long range air warning and AD capabilities and communication decks, while the  Rothesays remained specialised anti-submarine frigates designed to perform better at that single purpose.  In 1978, Rothesay went into refit for two years at a cost of £33.4 million Yarmouth and Plymouth completed similar refits in 1981, which included fitting Type 994 short range warning radar and target indicator essentially (Plessy AWS1) in the old antenna, giving faster screen data in the Rothesays operations room. This recent refit and marginally better radar resulted in their useful despatch for use in the Falklands War. It was planned to refit Rhyl, Brighton, Berwick and Falmouth with the very long range 2031 passive towed arrays which could listen for Soviet subs at ranges of  plus. However union strikes, allegedly inspired by Communist activists, made it impossible to supply the equipment, possibly indicating how much the Soviets feared the potential of Type 12s with quiet steam plant and quiet hull sonars to run fairly fast and listen in the Arctic. In the immediate aftermath of the Falklands War Berwick and Falmouth twice deployed south for post-war patrols in 1982–83, probably ending plans to refit them as towed array frigates, as well as sister ship Rhyl which suffered mechanical failure when ordered south, and Brighton which was scrapped following the 1981 Nott Defence Review and never transferred to the standby force.

Service

The Rothesays served throughout the 1960s and 1970s, with Londonderry converted into a weapons and electronics trials vessel in 1975. The successful performance of the Rothesays, and the ability they showed for sustained operation in rough North Atlantic sea conditions during the 1976 Cod War, showed that they were still relevant to the Royal Navy's main role of displaying that it had the ability to restrict Soviet submarine penetration through the Greenland-Iceland-UK Gap during the intensification of the Cold War. A more generous naval budget in the late 1970s provided by the new Prime Minister, the former RN Clerk James Callaghan, led to a provisional decision to retain the Rothesays through the 1980s with a second long refit. Plymouth, Yarmouth, and Rothesay were given full two year refits in 1978–81 with some significant updates of radar.

At the beginning of 1982, many of the class had been relegated to the Standby Squadron, likely to be disposed of following the 1981 defence review, with their sister ships likely to follow suit. However, the outbreak of the Falklands War reprieved the class. Plymouth and Yarmouth were despatched with the task force, with Plymouth playing one of the most active roles of any ship. While the class proved highly seaworthy in the rough South Atlantic, particularly in the winter patrols that followed, the initial favourable assessment of their performance in the war has been revised. It is questionable whether Seacat achieved a single kill, although both Yarmouth and Plymouth claim single shared hits on Douglas A-4 Skyhawk. Plymouths Wasp helicopter guided an AS-12 missile onto the elderly surface-running submarine , but only after it had been prevented from diving by depth charges and torpedo hits from the destroyer  and from a Wessex and a Lynx helicopter. On 1 May Yarmouth and the modern Type 22 frigate  detected submarine , which fired at least one German anti-ship SST-4 torpedo at them, but they failed to sink the submarine in 20 hours of mortar, torpedo and depth charge attacks. In the following weeks, the limitations of the Rothesays lack of modern sonar or link 10 data link were exposed, although Yarmouth saw the second firing of the second Exocet and may have decoyed it successfully with chaff it fired.

Other than Brighton the rest of the class were refitted for post war service, allowing the losses and damages suffered by the Royal Navy during the conflict to be rapidly made good. Berwick and Falmouth had been retained in a state of high readiness in the standby squadron, in the expectation they would be given a further long refit, possibly as towed array frigates. Their sister Lowestoft had been tested in this role. Berwick in particular still proved useful after its short refit, giving another three years' operational service, until mid 1985. The class paid off throughout the 1980s, with Rothesay finally paying off in 1988. The demise of the class also saw the withdrawal of the Wasp helicopter, the Leanders having been upgraded to carry the Westland Lynx.

New Zealand ships
The New Zealand Navy ordered two Type 12 ships in February 1957. Hastings was transferred as Otago while under construction, and Taranaki was ordered directly from the builders. They introduced bunk rather than traditional hammock bedding and rather different messing arrangements from the RN Type 12s. The ships were fitted with Seacat missiles by 1964. Unlike the Royal Navy Rothesays, Otago and Taranaki actually were armed with the Mk 20 heavyweight anti-submarine torpedoes, but abandoned them in the mid-1960s when it was clear the RN would only develop the weapons for submarines. Mk 32 tubes to fire Mk 44/46 12.75-inch US lightweight torpedoes were supplied to New Zealand about 1971 as surplus from life-expired, early 1960s USN Fleet Rehabilitation and Modernization destroyers and fitted to all RNZN frigates in 1971 as a matter of policy to replace the Limbo mortars, which were removed at major refits in July 1974. A minority of the RNZN officers and ratings opposed the change, on the grounds the mortars were more effective for cold war warning. New Zealand considered modernising Taranaki with gas turbines but retired the ships after 1981 when two surplus Leander-class frigates were offered for sale by the British.

South African ships (President class)
Three Type 12 frigates were ordered as part of the Simonstown Naval Agreement. They were identical to the Royal Navy vessels when built but were altered during refits. The three ships were named after presidents of the Boer republics:

 – after Paul Kruger
 – after Martinus Theunis Steyn
 – after Marthinus Wessel Pretorius

The modernisation involved installing a hangar and flight deck for a Westland Wasp helicopter, removing the Limbo mortar to form the flight deck, replacing the air search radar and fire control system and adding two triple  anti-submarine torpedo tubes.

The ships proved difficult to maintain due to the arms embargo and President Steyn was decommissioned in 1980 to provide spare parts.

Construction programme

Deck codes after midlife refits

See also

 – Australian ships based on the Type 12.
 – the original Type 12 design.
 – the Type 12M frigate, a general-purpose design following on from the success of the Type 12I

Notes

Footnotes

References

Cold War frigates of South Africa
Frigate classes
 
Ship classes of the Royal Navy
Ships of the South African Navy